Akash Puri is an Indian actor who works in Telugu films. He started his career in 2008 as a child actor in the films Chirutha, Bujjigadu, Ek Niranjan, The Lotus Pond, Businessman, Dhoni and Gabbar Singh.

Puri debuted as a lead and adult with the 2015 film Andhra Pori. His notable films include Mehbooba and Romantic.

Career
Puri made his debut as a child artist in Chirutha as a young Charan in 2007. The film was directed by his father Puri Jagannadh, starring Ramcharan and Neha Sharma. He has also done more 7 films as a child artist which includes Bujjigadu, Ek Niranjan, The Lotus Pond, Businessman, Dhoni and Gabbar Singh.

Puri made his debut as a lead actor in 2015 with the film Andhra Pori. After that, he made a film Mehbooba, which was directed by his father Puri Jagannadh. The film achieved a commercial hit. He  also starred in Romantic film with ketika Sharma which got mixed talk from viewers.

He will next featured in Romantic-Action film Chor Bazaar directed by B. Jeevan Reddy.

Filmography

Playback singer
"Mera Naam Vasco De Gama"

References

External links

Male actors from Hyderabad, India
Male actors in Telugu cinema
21st-century Indian male actors
Indian male child actors
Indian male film actors
Telugu male actors
Living people
21st-century Indian child actors
1997 births